Otto Höss (4 June 1897 – 27 March 1971) was an Austrian footballer. He played in six matches for the Austria national football team from 1923 to 1926.

References

External links
 

1897 births
1971 deaths
Austrian footballers
Austria international footballers
Place of birth missing
Association footballers not categorized by position